Celeste Mountjoy aka "Filthyratbag" is a contemporary Australian artist and illustrator whose art tackles feminism, mental health and the realities of womanhood. Her art often takes a satirical approach, commenting on the behavior of modern society.

Celeste Mountjoy has been creating art since she was a toddler, her earliest art journal from when she was 4 years old. her art has always been a combination of both illustrations and stories. Since moving out of home at 17 her art has been her full-time job. By 19 years of age, she had acquired quite a following online, and has exhibited her works in galleries around Australia.

Exhibitions 

 I've been to paradise but I've never been to me.
 10 Reasons Why Aurora Campbell & Celeste Mountjoy Are Pathetic.

References 

Year of birth missing (living people)
Living people
Australian women artists